The 1936 Home Nations Championship was the thirty-second series of the rugby union Home Nations Championship. Including the previous incarnations as the Five Nations, and prior to that, the Home Nations, this was the forty-ninth series of the northern hemisphere rugby union championship. Six matches were played between 18 January and 21 March. It was contested by England, Ireland, Scotland and Wales.

Table

Results

External links

1936
Home Nations
Home Nations
Home Nations
Home Nations
Home Nations
Home Nations Championship
Home Nations Championship
Home Nations Championship